The Pyrrhic War (280–275 BC) was largely fought between the Roman Republic and Pyrrhus, the king of Epirus, who had been asked by the people of the Greek city of Tarentum in southern Italy to help them in their war against the Romans.

A skilled commander, with a strong army fortified by war elephants (which the Romans were not experienced in facing), Pyrrhus enjoyed initial success against the Roman legions, but suffered heavy losses even in these victories. Plutarch wrote that Pyrrhus said after the second battle of the war, "If we are victorious in one more battle with the Romans, we shall be utterly ruined." He could not call up more men from home and his allies in Italy were becoming indifferent. The Romans, by contrast, had a very large pool of military manpower and could replenish their legions even if their forces were depleted in many battles. This has led to the expression "Pyrrhic victory", a term for a victory that inflicts losses the victor cannot afford in the long term.

Worn down by the battles against Rome, Pyrrhus moved his army to Sicily to war against the Carthaginians instead. After several years of campaigning there (278–275 BC), he returned to Italy in 275 BC, where the last battle of the war was fought, ending in Roman victory. Following this, Pyrrhus returned to Epirus, ending the war. Three years later, in 272 BC, the Romans captured Tarentum.

The Pyrrhic War was the first time that Rome confronted the professional mercenary armies of the Hellenistic states of the eastern Mediterranean. Rome's victory drew the attention of these states to the emerging power of Rome. Ptolemy II, the king of Egypt, established diplomatic relations with Rome. After the war, Rome asserted its hegemony over southern Italy.

Background 

By 290 BC, at the end of the three Samnite Wars, Rome had established her hegemony over parts of central and southern Italy, cemented through alliances with various Italic peoples in central Italy. To the south of the Roman sphere of influence there were a few city-states founded by Greek settlers from the 8th to the 6th century BC (primarily on the coasts of Calabria and Basilicata and in eastern and southern Sicily). Tarentum on the coast of Bruttium and Lucania was the largest and most powerful. The Tarentines attacked a Roman fleet off their coast. As a result, Rome declared war.

Different versions of the events which triggered the declaration of war exist. Appian, Cassius Dio and Zonaras appear to have blamed the war on the Tarentines. The part of the text of Dionysius of Halicarnassus regarding these events has been lost and Plutarch did not mention them.

In Appian's version, in 282 BC ten Roman ships appeared close to Tarentum, in the north-eastern part of the Gulf of Taranto. Allegedly, Publius Cornelius Dolabella (one of the two consuls for 283 BC) was sailing along the coast of Magna Graecia, sight-seeing. A demagogue reminded the townsfolk about an old treaty in which Romans had bound themselves not to sail beyond the promontory of Lacinium, which was near Croton, on the opposite side of the gulf. He persuaded them to attack the ships: four were sunk and one was captured "with all on board". This would have happened in 282 BC, the year after Dolabella's consulship, because that year he was fighting in central Italy. Appian did not explain why the consul was sight-seeing with so many ships.

Neither Cassius Dio nor Zonaras whose version was based on those of Cassius Dio, mentioned any treaties between the Romans and the Tarentines. Zonaras wrote that the Tarentines had associated with the Etruscans, Gauls, and Samnites, and that the Romans defeated these peoples in various battles over years. However, the Tarentines had not participated in these battles. Zonaras also described Lucius Valerius as ‘the admiral’ sailing to a place he had been sent to. The location was not specified by Zonaras. He wanted to set anchor off Tarentum, the reason of which was not specified either. The Tarentines thought that Lucius Valerius had retaliated for their past actions, hence sank his ships, killed and captured some of the crews.

In Cassius Dio's text, Lucius Valerius was sent on some errand. The Tarentines were intoxicated by wine during the Dionysiac festival celebration. When they saw his ships, they suspected Lucius Valerius' intention, attacking his ships "without any show force on his part or the slightest suspicion of any hostile act ..."  The Romans were angry about this "but did not choose to take the field against Tarentum at once. However, they despatched envoys, in order not to appear to have passed over the affair in silence and in that way render them more arrogant." The Tarentines did not accept the proposal of the envoys and insulted them. As a result, the Romans declared war.

In another fragment, Cassius Dio wrote that the Romans had learned that Tarentum was preparing for war against them and sent Gaius Fabricius Luscinus (one of the consuls for 282 BC) as an envoy to the cities allied with Rome to prevent a rebellion there. However, "these peoples" arrested him and sent men to the Etruscans, Umbrians, and Gauls, causing several of them to secede. He also wrote that the Tarentines had started the war but felt safe because the Romans pretended to be unaware of the Tarentines' plans because of their "temporary embarrassments." Cassius Dio did not clarify what the "temporary embarrassments" were. The Tarentines thought that they were not observed. They "behaved still more insolently and forced the Romans even against their will to make war upon them."

Cassius Dio's statements are ambiguous. The statement that the Romans learnt that Tarentum was preparing for war obscures the fact that the known events indicate Tarentum did so only when Rome declared war on them. The statement that the Tarentines started the war but felt safe, because the Romans pretended to be unaware of this, is also ambiguous. The Romans sent their envoys soon after the attacks on their ships and declared war soon after their envoys were insulted. Thus, it is hard to see what the pretence was.  This fragment claims that the Tarentines started the war, but in fact they just caused the events which led to it. As for Gaius Fabricius' being sent to the allies of Rome, this occurred in the year of the attack on the Roman ships, and it is likely that it was after this event. In that year there was also a rebellion by various Italic peoples, indicated by an entry for 282 BC in the annals of Livy's Periochae: "The Samnites revolted. In several battles, many commanders successfully fought against them and against the Lucanians, Bruttians, and Etruscans." It was probably prompted by the tensions between Rome and Tarentum.

Appian wrote that the Tarentines accused the Greek city of Thurii (on the eastern coast of Calabria) of preferring the Romans to themselves even though they were Greeks, "they held its citizens chiefly to blame for the Romans overpassing the limits [of the treaty]. Then they expelled the noblest citizens of Thurii, sacked the city, and dismissed the Roman garrison that was stationed there under a treaty." Livy's Periochae recorded that when the Romans were fighting the Lucani, they also decided to support the inhabitants of Thurii. The dating in this seems that it was in 286 or 285 BC. The plebeian tribune Gaius Aelius, who proposed to help this city, was honoured by its people with a statue in the Roman Forum. Dionysius of Halicarnassus, wrote that Gaius Fabricius Luscinus "conquered the Samnites, Lucanians and Bruttians in stubborn battles and had raised the siege of Thurii" when he served as consul in 282 BC.

Modern historical consensus gives the breach of the treaty mentioned by Appian and the raising of the siege of Thurii as the explanation for the attack on the Roman ships. Appian's claim of sight-seeing is deemed implausible. Tarentum was concerned about growing Roman influence in this area, which started with Thurii asking for Roman protection in 286 or 285 BC. This turning to Rome instead of Tarentum was taken as an acknowledgment of the emergence of Rome as the hegemonic power in Italy by the latter. This is probably why Appian wrote that the Tarentines blamed Thurii for overstepping the limits of the treaty, attacked the city and expelled the Roman garrison there. It has been speculated that the mentioned treaty might have been a peace treaty made by Alexander of Epirus with the Romans in 332 BC while campaigning in southern Italy to support Tarentum against the Lucani, or a treaty made with Cleonymus of Sparta in 303 BC for the same reason. There has also been speculation that when the Romans raised the siege of Thurii their troops might have been transported by a small fleet which turned up off Tarentum.

After the attack on their ships, the Romans sent envoys to demand the return of their prisoners and the people of Thurii, restoration of their plundered property and the surrender of the perpetrators. The envoys were presented to the people, who had been revelling during the Dionysiac festival. They were mocked for the way they spoke Greek and their Roman togas. One man relieved himself and soiled the clothing of the chief envoy. The leaders of the town did not apologise for this and rejected the proposal.

Dionysius of Halicarnassus wrote that when the envoys returned to Rome there was great indignation. Some argued that Rome should not send an army against Tarentum until she had subdued the rebelling Lucanians, Bruttii, Samnites, and the Etruscans. Those who argued for waging war immediately won the day. Appian wrote that Lucius Aemilius Barbula (one of the consuls for 281 BC) was ordered to suspend his operations against the Samnites, and invade Tarentum. He was to offer terms first and, if the Tarentines disagreed, he was to wage war. Zonaras, instead, wrote that Lucius Aemilius offered favourable propositions, hoping that the Tarentines would choose peace. However, the opinions of the Tarentines were divided. The pro-war faction sent envoys to Pyrrhus to propose an alliance. Lucius Aemilius got wind of this and pillaged the countryside. The Tarentines made sorties, but these were routed. Lucius Aemilius freeing some of the more influential prisoners led to hope for reconciliation. However, there were disagreements. Agis, a friend of the Romans, was chosen as the general of the city. Plutarch, too, wrote that the elderly, whom he described as sensible, opposed a plan to call for the aid of Pyrrhus. However, they were "overborne by the clamour and violence of the war party, and others, seeing this, absented themselves from the assembly." Plutarch did not mention the election of Agis.

Tarentum asks Pyrrhus for help

Dionysius of Halicarnassus wrote that the Tarentines decided to ask Pyrrhus to help them and banished those who were opposed to it. Prior to this, a Tarentine, Meton, pretended to be drunk to demonstrate the free and leisurely lifestyle of the Tarentines, argued against allowing a king to garrison the city and claimed that this would bring many evils to a free and democratic city like Tarentum. He was listened to for a while, but then he was thrown out of the theatre where the assembly of the people had convened. Cassius Dio also related that Meton failed to persuade the Tarentines not to engage in war with the Romans and that he argued that Tarentum would lose its freedom under Pyrrhus. Plutarch wrote that his words "brought conviction to most of the Tarentines, and a murmur of applause ran through the assembly. But those who were afraid that if peace were made they would be given up to the Romans, reviled the people for tamely submitting to such shameless treatment from a drunken reveller, and banding together they cast Meton out." After that a decree to send envoys from Tarentum and other Greek cities in Italy to Pyrrhus was passed. They brought gifts and claimed if he went to Italy he would find a force of 50,000 infantry and 20,000 cavalry gathered from Tarentum, Messapia, Lucania and Samnium. This got Pyrrhus excited and made the Epirotes eager to fight in Italy.

Cassius Dio wrote that Pyrrhus "had a particularly high opinion of his powers because he was deemed by foreign nations a match for the Romans." He had for a long time coveted Sicily and considered how to overthrow Roman power, but he did not want to fight them "when no wrong had been done him." Both Cassius Dio and Plutarch wrote about Cineas, an important adviser of Pyrrhus. He was a man from Thessaly with a reputation for great wisdom who had been a pupil of Demosthenes the orator. Pyrrhus held him in high regard. Cineas saw the folly of an expedition to Italy. He tried to dissuade Pyrrhus and urged him to be satisfied with the possessions he already had, but Pyrrhus did not listen to him.

Pyrrhus asked Antiochus I (the king of the Seleucid Empire) for money and Antigonus II (the king of Macedon) to lend him ships to carry his army to Italy. Ptolemy II (the king of the Ptolemaic Kingdom in Egypt) gave him 5,000 infantry and 2,000 cavalry on condition that they would not serve him for more than two years. In exchange, since Pyrrhus would be taking the best of his army to Italy, he appointed Ptolemy as guardian of his kingdom while he was away.

Zonaras wrote that Pyrrhus, who saw the request for help as a lucky break for his aims in Italy, insisted on a clause in the treaty with the Tarentines which provided that he should not be detained in Italy longer than needed in order not to arouse suspicions. After that he detained most of the Tarentine envoys as hostages with the excuse that he needed them to help him to get his army ready. He sent a few of them ahead with Cineas who was given some troops. This came in the way of negotiations with the Romans. He arrived soon after the election of Agis and his arrival encouraged the Tarentines, who stopped their attempts at reconciliation with the Romans. They deposed Agis and elected one of the envoys as commander. Shortly after this Pyrrhus sent Milo, one of his lieutenants, ahead with another force. He took the acropolis to serve as headquarters for Pyrrhus and took over the guarding of the wall. The Tarentines were happy to be relieved from this task, gave food to the troops and sent money to Pyrrhus. Plutarch wrote that Cineas went to Tarentum with 3,000 soldiers.

Lucius Aemilius saw that the soldiers of Pyrrhus arrived and could not hold out because it was winter. He set off for Apulia. He was ambushed by the Tarentines at a narrow pass. However, he put some captives in front and they stopped the attack because they did not want to hurt their compatriots.

Zonaras wrote that Pyrrhus did not even wait for the spring to cross the sea to reach Italy (the Mediterranean Sea is stormy in the winter). He was caught in a storm. He lost many men and the rest was scattered by the sea. He reached Tarentum overland with difficulty. Plutarch wrote that after many ships were sent from Tarentum, 20,000 infantry, 2,000 archers, 500 slingers, 3,000 cavalry, and twenty elephants were embarked. When the fleet was caught in the storm some ships missed Italy and ended up in the seas of Sicily and Africa. Others were swept to other shores and were destroyed. Pyrrhus threw himself into the sea and managed to reach the coast. He was helped by the Messapii. Some of the ships survived the storm. Only 2,000 infantry, a few cavalry and two elephants reached Italy.

Pyrrhus did not do anything against the will of the Tarentines and did not impose anything on them until the surviving ships arrived and he assembled most of his forces. After that he put restrictions on the inhabitants because they were only interested in a leisurely lifestyle and would have let him do all the fighting. He closed all the gymnasia, banned festivals, banquets, revelry and drinking.  He closed the theatre in case the people gathered there for a revolt. He feared that the people, feeling oppressed, might defect to the Romans. Therefore, he sent Tarentine men who could be able politicians to Epirus and assassinated some of them. He ordered that the citizens undergo severe military exercise or face a penalty and put the men of military age into military service alongside his soldiers, dividing them into two companies. Zonaras also wrote that Pyrrhus placed guards in people's houses so that they would not leave the city. The Tarentines felt that they found in Pyrrhus a master instead of an ally. Some people complained and left the ranks. Plutarch wrote: "Many therefore left the city, since they were not accustomed to being under orders, and called it servitude not to live as they pleased."  Appian wrote that the penalty for not undergoing severe military exercises was death; the "king's officers [ ] quartered themselves upon the citizens by force, and openly abused their wives and children.... [M]any people ... fled the city as though it were a foreign government and took refuge in the fields, ... [and] Pyrrhus ... closed the [city] gates and placed guards over them."

The Greek city of Rhegium, in Calabria, on the Strait of Messina, asked the Romans for a garrison. The Romans sent a contingent of 4,000 men to the city. At first they honoured their duty. However, with the Romans being busy dealing with Tarentum and Pyrrhus, this contingent was not under strict discipline and, instigated by Decius, their commander, they coveted the riches of the city. They were inspired by the Mamertines, mercenaries who had been placed to garrison the city of Messana (in Sicily, on the other side of the narrow Strait of Messina) by Agathocles of Syracuse and seized the city, killing its male inhabitants, when he died in 289 BC. Decius presented letters which he claimed were written to Pyrrhus by some citizens who wanted to betray the city to him. He also got a man to announce that part of Pyrrhus’ fleet was anchored nearby. This provided a pretext for seizing the city. Many people were killed. Decius then ratified a friendship with the Mamertines. The Romans did not react immediately because they were busy dealing with Pyrrhus. They were reproached because they did not seem to give this matter great importance. During his second consulship in 278 BC, after Pyrrhus went to Sicily, Gaius Fabricius Luscinus was sent to Rhegium. He besieged the city and seized it. The surviving rebels were sent to Rome, where they were beaten with rods and executed for treason, their bodies cast away unburied. Decius committed suicide.

Battle of Heraclea (280 BC) and subsequent negotiations

Prior to this time, Rome had never pitted its military strength against any of the Hellenistic states in the eastern Mediterranean.

Publius Valerius Laevinus, one of the two consuls for 280 BC, marched against Pyrrhus with a large army and plundered Lucania on his way. He wanted to fight as far away from Roman territory as possible and hoped that by marching on Pyrrhus he would frighten him. He seized a strong strategic point in Lucania to hinder those who wanted to aid Pyrrhus. Pyrrhus sent him a letter saying that he had come to the aid of the Tarentines and the Italic peoples and asking the Romans to leave him to settle their differences with the Tarentines, Lucanians and Samnites. He would arbitrate justly and redress any damage these peoples may have caused. He called on the Romans to offer sureties with respect to any charges against them and abide by his decisions. If Romans accepted this he would be their friend; if they did not, it would be war. The consul replied the Romans would not accept him as a judge for their disputes with other peoples. They did not fear him as a foe, and would fight and exact penalties they wished. Pyrrhus should think who he would offer as sureties for the payment of penalties. He also invited Pyrrhus to put his issues before the Senate. Laevinus captured some scouts and showed them his troops, telling them that he had many more men, and sent them back to Pyrrhus.

Pyrrhus had not yet been joined by his allies and took to the field with his forces. He set up his camp on the plain between the cities of Pandosia and Heracleia. He then went to see the Roman camp further along the River Siris. He decided to delay to wait for his allies and, hoping that the supplies of the Romans, who were in hostile territory, would fail, placed guards by the river. The Romans decided to move before his allies would arrive and forded the river. The guards withdrew. Pyrrhus, now worried, placed the infantry in battle line and advanced with the cavalry, hoping to catch the Romans while they were still crossing. Seeing the large Roman infantry and cavalry advancing towards him, Pyrrhus formed a close formation and attacked. The Roman cavalry began to give way and Pyrrhus called in his infantry. The battle remained undecided for a long time. The Romans were pushed back by the elephants and their horses were frightened of them. Pyrrhus then deployed the Thessalian cavalry. The Romans were thrown into confusion and were routed.

Zonaras wrote that all the Romans would have been killed had it not been for a wounded elephant trumpeting and throwing the rest of these animals into confusion. This "restrained Pyrrhus from pursuit and the Romans thus managed to cross the river and make their escape into an Apulian city." Cassius Dio wrote that "Pyrrhus became famous for his victory and acquired a great reputation from it, to such an extent that many who had been remaining neutral came over to his side and all the allies who had been watching the turn of events joined him. He did not openly display anger towards them nor did he entirely conceal his suspicions; he rebuked them somewhat for their delay, but otherwise received them kindly." Plutarch noted that Dionysius of Halicarnassus stated that nearly 15,000 Romans and 13,000 Greeks fell, but according to Hieronymus of Cardia 7,000 Romans and 4,000 Greeks fell. The text of Hieronymus of Cardia has been lost and the part of the text of Dionysius which mentions this is also lost. Plutarch wrote that Pyrrhus lost his best troops and his most trusted generals and friends.  However, some of cities allied with the Romans went over to him. He marched to within, 60 kilometres from Rome, plundering the territories along the way. He was joined belatedly by many of the Lucanians and Samnites. Pyrrhus was glad that he had defeated the Romans with his own troops.

Cassius Dio wrote that Pyrrhus learnt that Gaius Fabricius Luscinus and other envoys were approaching to negotiate about his captives. He sent a guard for them as far as the border and then went to meet them. He escorted them into the city and entertained and honoured them, hoping for a truce. Fabricius said he had come to get back their captives and Pyrrhus was surprised they had not been commissioned to negotiate peace terms. Pyrrhus said that he wanted to make friends and a peace treaty and that he would release the prisoners without a ransom. The envoys refused to negotiate such terms. Pyrrhus handed over the prisoners and sent Cineas to Rome with them to negotiate with the Roman senate. Cineas lingered before seeking an audience with the senate to visit the leading men of Rome. He went to the senate after he had won over many of them. He offered friendship and an alliance. There was a long debate in the senate and many senators were inclined to make a truce.

Livy and Justin, like Cassius Dio, placed Gaius Fabricius and the other envoys going to see Pyrrhus before Cineas went to Rome. In Livy's Periochae, Fabricius negotiated the return of the prisoners and the mission of Cineas was about organising Pyrrhus' entrance into the city as well as negotiating a peace treaty. In Justin's account, Fabricius made a peace treaty with Pyrrhus and Cineas went to Rome to ratify the treaty. He also wrote that Cineas "found nobody's house open for their reception." Plutarch, instead, had this sequence the other way round. He placed the embassy led by Gaius Fabricius after Cineas' trip to Rome and wrote that Pyrrhus sought friendly terms because he was concerned about the Romans still being belligerent after their defeat and he considered the capture of Rome to be beyond the size of his force. Moreover, a friendly settlement after a victory would enhance his reputation. Cineas offered to free the Roman prisoners, promised to help the Romans with the subjugation of Italy and asked only friendship and immunity for Tarentum in return.

Many senators were inclined towards peace (in Plutarch's account) or a truce (in Cassius Dio's account) because the Romans would have to face a larger army as the Italic allies of Pyrrhus had joined him. However, Appius Claudius Caecus, who was old and blind and had been confined to his house, had himself carried to the senate house in a litter. He said that Pyrrhus was not to be trusted and that a truce (or peace) was not advantageous to the state. He called for Cineas to be dismissed from the city immediately and for Pyrrhus to be told to withdraw to his country and to make his proposals from there. The senate voted unanimously to send away Cineas that very day and to continue the war for so long as Pyrrhus was in Italy.

Appian wrote that the senate decreed to levy two new legions for the consul Publius Valerius Laevinus. He noted that some of the sources of his information reported that Cineas, who was still in Rome, saw the Roman people hastening to enroll and told Pyrrhus that he was fighting against a hydra (a mythological monster with many heads which grew two new heads when one head was cut off). Other sources said that Pyrrhus himself saw that the Roman army was now large because Tiberius Coruncanius, the other consul, "came from Etruria and joined his forces with those of Laevinus." Appian wrote that Cineas also said that Rome was a city of generals and that it seemed a city with many kings. Pyrrhus marched towards Rome plundering everything on the way. He reached Anagnia and decided to postpone the battle because he was heavily laden with the booty. He went to Campania and sent his army to winter camps. Florus wrote that Pyrrhus' march on Rome laid waste the banks of the River Liris and the Roman colony of Fregellae and reached Praeneste (today's Palestrina), which was only twenty miles from Rome and which he nearly seized. Plutarch wrote that Cineas assessed that the Romans now had twice as many soldiers as those who fought at the Battle of Heraclea and that "there were many times as many Romans still who were capable of bearing arms." Justin wrote that Cineas told Pyrrhus that the treaty "was broken off by Appius Claudius" and that Rome appeared to him a city of kings.

Cassius Dio gave a different account of Pyrrhus’ march towards Rome. In his version, it was a march in Tyrrhenian Italy. Publius Valerius Laevinus found out that Pyrrhus wanted to seize Capua (in Campania) and garrisoned it. Pyrrhus set out for the nearby Neapolis (Naples), but he did not accomplish anything and passed on through Etruria "with the object of winning the people there also to his cause." According to Zonaras, Pyrrhus saw that the Etruscans had made a treaty with the Romans, Tiberius Coruncanius, the other consul for 280 BC, was moving towards him and Laevinius was dogging his footsteps. He "became afraid of being cut off on all sides." He withdrew and got close to Campania. Laevinus confronted him with an army which was now larger and "he declared that the Roman legions when cut to pieces grew whole again, hydra-fashion." Pyrrhus declined to join a battle and went back to Tarentum. Because of the fragmentary nature of the surviving texts of Cassius Dio and Zonaras, the dating of these events is uncertain. It could be after Cineas’ trip to Rome. Cassius Dio wrote that the Romans sent another army to Laevinus, who, after seeing to the wounded, followed Pyrrhus and harassed him. They also recalled Tiberius Coruncanius from Etruria and assigned him to guard Rome.

According to Justin, Rome sent some envoys to Ptolemy II, the king of the Ptolemaic Kingdom in Egypt.

Battle of Asculum (279 BC) 

Cassius Dio wrote that during the winter both sides prepared for the next battle. In the spring, Pyrrhus invaded Apulia. Many places were captured or capitulated. The Romans came upon him near Asculum and encamped opposite him. The two sides avoided each other for several days.  There were rumours that Publius Decius Mus (one of the two consuls for 279 BC) was getting ready to devote himself like his father and grandfather. In a devotio a Roman commander sacrificed his life by suicidally launching himself into the enemy ranks as a vow to the gods in exchange for a victory when the Roman troops were overwhelmed. This galvanised the Roman soldiers. The rumour alarmed the Italic followers of Pyrrhus, who believed his death would ruin them. Pyrrhus endeavoured to reassure them and ordered to seize alive anyone who wore the garments the Decius family used for devoting themselves. He sent a man to tell Publius Decius that he would not succeed in his intent and after being taken alive he would die miserably. The Roman consuls replied that there was no need to resort to a devotio because the Romans would defeat him without it.

Three ancient historians wrote accounts of this battle: Dionysius of Halicarnassus, Plutarch and Cassius Dio. In the version of Plutarch, the battle took place over two days. In the other two versions it lasted one day. In Cassius Dio's version the Romans won. In Plutarch's version Pyrrhus won. Plutarch noted that Dionysius of Halicarnassus "made no mention two battles, nor of an admitted defeat of the Romans." In fact, Dionysius did not say who won the battle. Plutarch also wrote that Pyrrhus said to someone who was congratulating him: "If we are victorious in one more battle with the Romans, we shall be utterly ruined." This was because he lost a great part of the forces he had brought to Italy and most of his commanders. He could not call up more men from home and his allies in Italy were becoming indifferent. The Romans, instead, could quickly replenish their forces "as if from a fountain gushing forth indoors", and did not lose courage or determination in defeat.

Alliance between Rome and Carthage

Justin wrote that in 279 BC the Carthaginians were worried that Pyrrhus might get involved in Sicily, where they had possessions in the west of the island, to help the Greek cities in eastern and southern Sicily against them. There had been reports that the Sicilian Greeks had asked him for his assistance. Justin wrote that Mago, a Carthaginian commander was sent to the port of Rome with 120 ships and met the Roman senate to offer help. The senate declined the assistance. The Carthaginians, who were hoping that war with Rome would prevent Pyrrhus from going to Sicily, were worried about Pyrrhus putting the Romans in distress. A few days later Mago went to meet Pyrrhus privately, "as if to be a peace-maker from the people of Carthage, but in reality to discover the king's views with regard to Sicily, to which island it was reported that he was sent for." Justin placed these events before Gaius Fabricius' embassy to Pyrrhus and Cineas' trip to Rome (see above).

Polybius discovered the documents of a series of treaties between Rome and Carthage in a library in Rome. One of them, the fourth one, was against Pyrrhus. It stipulated that: "If they make an alliance with Pyrrhus, both shall make it an express condition that they may go to the help of each other in whichever country is attacked. No matter which require help, the Carthaginians are to provide the ships for transport and hostilities, but each country shall provide the pay for its own men. The Carthaginians, if necessary, shall come to the help of the Romans by sea too, but no one shall compel the crews to land against their will." Livy's Periochae placed the conclusion of this treaty after the Battle of Asculum.

The two parties collaborated in only one instance. There was no Roman assistance when Pyrrhus campaigned in Sicily and no Carthaginian assistance when Pyrrhus returned to Italy. Diodorus Siculus wrote that after making the alliance and before Pyrrhus' crossing from Italy to Sicily, the Carthaginians took 500 Roman legionaries on board their ships and sailed across to Rhegium (presumably from Sicily). They besieged the rebel Roman garrison which had seized the city (see above), but gave the siege up, but not before setting fire to some timber which had been gathered for shipbuilding. They remained and kept a watch on the narrow Strait of Messina between Italy and Sicily, looking out for any attempt by Pyrrhus to cross it. This must have been the first action against the rebel Roman garrison at Rhegium. The consul Gaius Fabricius Luscinus eventually defeated the garrison and restored the city to its people.

Sicilian campaign (278–275 BC)

Pyrrhus went to Sicily and took the leadership of the Greek cities of eastern and southern Sicily in a war against the Carthaginians in western Sicily. There had been a history of conflict between the Greeks and the Carthaginians in Sicily (see Sicilian Wars). We have details about Pyrrhus' campaign against the Carthaginians from two fragments from the work of Diodorus Siculus. Plutarch gave only a very brief account, most of which was about the relationship between Pyrrhus and the Greek cities in Sicily. The fragments from the text of Dionysius of Halicarnassus are also about Pyrrhus and the Sicilian Greeks. The fragments from Appian deal mostly with events which occurred when Pyrrhus was leaving Sicily. We have minimal information from the fragments from the text of Cassius Dio.

In Plutarch's account, Pyrrhus received two requests for help. Men from the Greek cities of Sicily "offered to put into his hands the cities of Agrigentum, Syracuse, and Leontini, and begged him to help them to drive out the Carthaginians and rid the island of its tyrants." The Macedonians asked him to accede to the throne of Macedon when their king, Ptolemy Keraunos, whose army was defeated in the Gallic invasion of Greece, was captured and beheaded by the Gauls.  Pyrrhus decided that Sicily provided better opportunities for glory since Africa "was felt to be nearer" – Plutarch thought that Pyrrhus coveted the conquest of Carthage, which was in Africa. He sent Cineas to hold talks with the Greek cities in Sicily while he garrisoned Tarentum. The Tarentines were unhappy and demanded that he either continue the war with Rome or go away and leave Tarentum as he had found it. In other words, they wanted the end of his tyrannical rule of the city if he left. Pyrrhus left without giving a reply.

Appian wrote that Pyrrhus begun to be more concerned about Sicily than Italy because Agathocles, the tyrant of Syracuse and self-proclaimed king of Sicily, had just died and Pyrrhus had married his daughter Lanassa. However, Appian must have been confused. Agathocles died in 289 BC, nine years before Pyrrhus’ venture in Italy and eleven years before he went to Sicily. Moreover, Lanassa had left Pyrrhus in 291 BC. It's possible Appian was referring to Pyrrhus' hereditary claims following Agathocles' death, and this relatively recent event, Pyrrhus' claims, as well as Pyrrhus' proximity prompted the inhabitants of Syracuse in 279 BC to ask him for assistance against Carthage. According to Appian, Pyrrhus was reluctant to leave those in Italy who had asked for his help without a peace settlement. He sent Cineas to Rome to negotiate a peace once more. He received the same answer. The Romans returned the Tarentines and the Italic allies they held as prisoners. In Appian's account there was an armistice. Pyrrhus then set off for Sicily with 8,000 cavalry and his elephants. He promised his allies that he would return to Italy. Pyrrhus left Milo in Tarentum to garrison the city. According to Justin, he also left his son Alexander to garrison Locris.

Plutarch wrote that Thoenon and Sosistratus, the leading men in Syracuse, were the first to persuade Pyrrhus to go to Sicily. Diodorus Siculus wrote that "Thoenon controlled the island [of Syracuse], while Sosistratus ruled Syracuse. They had ten thousand soldiers [in Syracuse], and carried on war with each other. But both, becoming exhausted in the war, sent ambassadors to Pyrrhus." While Pyrrhus was preparing to set sail, the Carthaginians were besieging Syracuse. They blockaded her port with a fleet. They conducted operations near the city walls and pillaged the countryside with 50,000 men. The Syracusans pinned their hopes on Pyrrhus because he had married Lanassa. When Pyrrhus set sail from Tarentum, he stopped over at Locris.

The Mamertine mercenaries who had seized the city of Messana (Messina) made an alliance with the Carthaginians and joined them in trying to prevent Pyrrhus from crossing the Strait of Messina. Therefore, Pyrrhus could not land at Messana or Syracuse. However, Tyndarion, the tyrant of Tauromenia (Taormina, south of Messana), sided with Pyrrhus and was willing to receive his forces in his city. Pyrrhus received soldiers from him and then landed at Catana, which was also between Messana and Syracuse. He was welcomed by its citizens and disembarked his infantry, which marched on Syracuse, flanked by the fleet. When he got close to Syracuse, a reduced Carthaginian fleet (thirty ships had gone on other missions) left.

Pyrrhus accepted delivery of the "[i]sland [of the city] from Thonon, and of the rest of the city from the citizens and Sosistratus." He added that, besides ruling Syracuse, "Sosistratus had made himself master of Agrigentum and of many other cities, and had an army of more than ten thousand men." Pyrrhus reconciled "Thoenon and Sosistratus and the Syracusans and restored harmony, thinking to gain great popularity by virtue of the peace." He took over the military equipment of the city and her 140 ships. Pyrrhus now had more than 200 ships. Dionysius of Halicarnassus wrote that Sosistratus was the ruler of the city and Thonon was the commander of the garrison. They gave Pyrrhus money from the treasury and 200 warships. According to Diodorus Siculus, the ruler of the city of Leontini handed him over the city and its 4,000 infantry and 500 cavalry. Other cities did the same. The city of Enna had expelled the garrison the Carthaginians had placed there, and promised to hand itself over to Pyrrhus. Pyrrhus went to Agrigentum and took over the city, as well as 8,000 infantry and 800 cavalry who were picked men. He also took over thirty cities ruled by Sosistratus and brought over the siege engines and the missiles of Syracuse.

According to Diodorus Siculus, Pyrrhus set off for the territories subject to the Carthaginians with 30,000 infantry and 1,500 cavalry. In Plutarch's account Pyrrhus had 30,000 infantry, 2,500 cavalry and 200 ships. Diodorus related that Pyrrhus defeated the Carthaginian garrison in Heraclea Minoa and seized Azones. Selinus, Halicyae, Segesta and other cities went over to him. He besieged Eryx, which had strong natural defensive features and a large Carthaginian garrison. The siege lasted a long time, but Pyrrhus managed to take the city by storm. He left a garrison there and attacked Iaetia, which was a powerful city in a good strategic position to attack Panormus, which had the best harbour in Sicily. Iaetia surrendered without a fight. Panormus was taken by storm. Pyrrhus was in control of all the Carthaginian dominions except for Lilybaeum. While he was besieging this city, the Carthaginians brought over a big army and large quantities of grain from Africa. They also strengthened the fortifications of the city. Plutarch, whose account of Pyrrhus’ campaign in the Carthaginian territories was brief, just wrote that Pyrrhus subdued the areas under Carthaginian control and that after seizing Eryx he moved against the Mamertine mercenaries who had seized Messana. They were a nuisance to the Greeks and even imposed a tribute on some of them. Pyrrhus captured their tribute collectors and executed them. He defeated the Mamertines in battle and destroyed many of their strongholds.  Plutarch did not mention the siege of Lilybaeum and Diodorus Siculus did not mention the campaign against the Mamertines.

Both Plutarch and Diodorus Siculus wrote that the Carthaginians initiated negotiations. They offered a large sum of money. In Plutarch's account, they also offered ships. According to Diodorus Siculus, Pyrrhus refused to accept money and was persuaded to concede Lilybaeum to the Carthaginians. However, his friends and the delegates from the Greek cities urged him not to "grant [them] a stepping-stone for an attack on Sicily, but rather to drive the Phoenicians out of the entire island and to make the sea the boundary of his domain." Plutarch did not mention Pyrrhus being swayed by his friends and the delegates of the cities. In his version, Pyrrhus rejected the offer because he wanted "to pursue the ambitions for which he had left home in the beginning and set his heart on Libya." In other words, Pyrrhus wanted to conquer Carthage, which was in what the Greeks called Libya (Plutarch was Greek) and the Romans called Africa. In Diodorus Siculus’ account, the negotiations occurred during the siege of Lilybaeum. After this Pyrrhus engaged in skirmishes near the city walls. The Carthaginians resisted effectively because of the size of their forces and because they had so many catapults that there was not enough room for all of them on the city walls. Many of the men of Pyrrhus were killed and he was at a disadvantage. Pyrrhus set out to build war engines which were more powerful than those he brought from Syracuse. However, the Carthaginian resistance continued, favoured by the rocky terrain. After two months he gave up the siege. Pyrrhus then bent his efforts towards building a large fleet to transport his troops to Africa after he gained mastery of the sea.

Plutarch wrote that many of Pyrrhus' ships were undermanned and he began to collect oarsmen. He stopped dealing with the Greek cities fairly and treated them in a despotic manner, using compulsion and imposing fines. He was no longer a popular leader. He became a tyrant known for "ingratitude and faithlessness". At first the Sicilian Greeks put up with this. Things changed when Pyrrhus became suspicious of Sosistratus and Thoenon, the men who had invited him to Sicily and had been of great assistance to him. Sosistratus was afraid of the suspicions of Pyrrhus and kept a low profile. Pyrrhus accused Thoenon of complicity with Sosistratus and had him executed. Dionysius of Halicarnassus gave some details of the behaviour of Pyrrhus. He seized the estates of Agathocles of Syracuse from the relatives and friends who had inherited them and gave them to his friends. He gave the chief offices in the cities to his military men. He conducted some trials and some administrative tasks himself and assigned others to members of his court, who were interested only in personal gain and luxury. He established garrisons with the excuse that they were for protection against the Carthaginians. He arrested the cities’ most prominent men and had them executed on false treason charges, one of whom was Thoenon. Pyrrhus tried to arrest Sosistratus, but he escaped from the city.

The actions of the king caused hatred in the Greek cities. According to Plutarch, some of them sided with the Carthaginians and some called in the Mamertine mercenaries.  While Pyrrhus was facing opposition and rebellion, he received a letter from the Tarentines and Samnites. The Samnites had been pushed out from their rural areas and found it difficult to defend their cities and begged him to come to their assistance. This gave Pyrrhus an excuse to leave Sicily, where he had lost control, without appearing to be running away. Plutarch wrote that Pyrrhus said "My friends, what a wrestling ground for Carthaginians and Romans we are leaving behind us!" We do not know whether Pyrrhus actually said this because ancient historians often made speeches by historical characters up. Cassius Dio wrote that when the Carthaginians saw that Pyrrhus' forces were small and that he had lost the goodwill of the Sicilian Greeks, they "took up the war vigorously. They harboured the Syracusans who were exiled and harassed [Pyrrhus] so severely that he abandoned not only Syracuse but Sicily as well." Dionysius of Halicarnassus that wrote the Carthaginians sent an army to Sicily because the situation gave them an opportunity to regain the cities they had lost. After Pyrrhus left Sicily, the Carthaginians took control of their domains in the west again.

Return to Italy, Battle of Beneventum and end of the war
Plutarch wrote that the Carthaginian fleet confronted Pyrrhus when he was crossing the Strait of Messina to reach the mainland. He lost many ships in a naval battle. The Mamertine mercenaries, 10,000 of whom had crossed the strait, fought Pyrrhus in the mainland, threw his army into confusion and killed two elephants and many men in his rear-guard. Pyrrhus received a head wound, but managed to overcome the Mamertines. He arrived in Tarentum in the autumn of 276 BC with 20,000 men.

Dionysius of Halicarnassus did not mention a naval battle in the Strait of Messina. He wrote that the ships of Pyrrhus, who wanted to sail straight to Tarentum, met an unfavourable wind which lasted the whole night. Some ships were sunk. Some were swept to the Strait of Messina and others were driven ashore on the beaches of Locris. The crew of the ships beached near Locris died when they were submerged by the backwash of the waves. According to Dionysius, this happened because Pyrrhus, misled by one of his friends, Euegorus son of Theodorus, and pushed by lack of funds, plundered the sacred treasure of the temple of the goddess Persephone, thus committing sacrilege. Dionysius did not specify where this took place. However, his narrative suggests that it occurred in Syracuse prior to setting off for Italy. The ships which were driven to the shores of Locris were the ones which were carrying the offerings to the goddess. When the waves broke the ships up, the sacred monies of the treasure were cast on the shore closest to Locris. Pyrrhus got scared and restored them to the goddess.

Appian mentioned the naval battle with the Carthaginians in the strait of Messina, but not the battle with the Mamertines on the mainland. In his account Pyrrhus took possession of the treasure of Persephone in Locris, after crossing from Sicily to Italy. He wrote that Pyrrhus had been a burden to the Greek cities because of the lodging and supplying of his troops, the garrisons he established, and the tribute he imposed. These exactions enriched him. When he left Sicily he set sail for Rhegium with ten ships and many cargo and merchant ships. The Carthaginians attacked him and sunk seventy ships and disabled the rest, except for twelve ships. He managed to escape and took vengeance on the city of Locris, whose inhabitants had killed the commander of his garrison there. He did much killing and plundering and grabbed the treasure of Persephone. He set sail again and got caught in a storm, which sunk some of his ships. All the sacred objects were swept to the beach of Locris. Pyrrhus restored them to the goddess and tried perform sacrifices in her honour. However, the sacrificial victims were inauspicious and he got angry. He executed those who advised him to rob the temple, had taken part in it or assented to it.

Cassius Dio wrote that when Pyrrhus went to Sicily the Romans postponed their conflict with Tarentum. In 277 BC, the consuls Publius Cornelius Rufinus and Gaius Junius Bubulcus Brutus invaded and devastated Samnium. The Samnites took their most important treasures to the Cranita hills. The consuls tried to climb these hills, but they failed because they were overgrown with shrubbery, and so were defeated. Many of them died and many were taken prisoner. After this, the two consuls, blaming each other for the reverse, did not carry on the war together. Junius Bubulcus ravaged part of Samnium; Cornelius Rufinus attacked the Lucani and Bruttii and after this he took on Croton (which had revolted) at the invitation of some pro-Romans in the city. The anti-Roman faction asked Milo, the lieutenant Pyrrhus had left in Tarentum, for help. Milo sent Nicomachus who garrisoned the city. Unaware of this, Cornelius Rufinus approached the city walls carelessly and was defeated by a sortie.  He sent two men to Nicomachus. They pretended to be deserters and claimed that the consul had given up on Croton and was advancing on Locris, which was being betrayed to him.  Cornelius Rufinus pretended to be departing in haste. Nicomachus hurried towards Locris. Rufinus turned back undetected and seized Croton. Nicomachus went back to Tarentum, while Locris went over to the Romans. Like Appian, Cassius Dio wrote that Pyrrhus plundered the treasure of Persephone in Locris. However, according to him, he did so because his allies (presumably the allies in Italy) were unwilling to contribute anything to support him, whereas according to Appian, this was an act of revenge for the city going over to the Romans.

When Pyrrhus returned to Italy in 275 BC, he fought the Battle of Beneventum against the Romans, which was to be the last battle of the war.

Plutarch gave the most detailed account of the battle. He wrote that during the three years Pyrrhus spent campaigning in Sicily the Samnites suffered many defeats at the hands of the Romans and lost a substantial part of their territory. This made them resentful towards Pyrrhus. Therefore, most of them did not join him when he returned to southern Italy. Cassius Dio wrote that the Samnites being hard-pressed by the Romans, caused Pyrrhus to set forth again to come to their assistance. In Plutarch's account, Pyrrhus engaged the Romans despite the lack of Samnite support. The two consuls for 275 BC, Lucius Cornelius Lentulus Caudinus and Manius Curius Dentatus, were fighting in Lucania and Samnium respectively.

Plutarch wrote that Pyrrhus divided his forces into two divisions. He sent one of them against Cornelius Lentulus and marched with the other force during the night against Manius Curius, who was encamped near Beneventum and was waiting for help from Cornelius Lentulus. Pyrrhus was in a hurry to engage Manius Curius in case his colleague showed up. However, his soldiers lost their way and fell behind because he went a long way round through woods and his lights did not hold out. Dionysius of Halicarnassus wrote that Pyrrhus marched through "long trails that were not even used by people but were mere goat-paths through woods and crags, would keep no order and, even before the enemy came in sight, would be weakened in body by thirst and fatigue." This delayed Pyrrhus and at dawn he was in full view of the enemy as he advanced on them from the heights. Plutarch wrote that Manius Curius led his men out of the camp, attacked the enemy advance-guard and captured some elephants which were left behind. This success brought him to the plain, where he could engage Pyrrhus in battle on level ground. He routed some of the enemy lines, but an elephant charge drove him back to his camp. He called on the camp guards who were standing on the parapets of the rampart. They came down and threw javelins at the elephants, forcing them to turn round. They ran through the ranks of Pyrrhus, which were thrown into disarray, and, as a result, the Romans won the battle.

Dionysius of Halicarnassus wrote only one sentence about the battle: "When Pyrrhus and those with him had ascended along with the elephants, and the Romans became aware of it, they wounded an elephant [calf], which caused great confusion and flight among the Greeks. The Romans killed two elephants, and hemming eight others in a place that had no outlet, took them alive when the Indian mahouts surrendered them; and they wrought great slaughter among the soldiers."

Cassius Dio also related the story of the wounded calf. He wrote that Pyrrhus was put to flight because "a young elephant had been wounded, and shaking off its riders, wandered about in search of its mother, whereupon the latter became excited and the other elephants grew turbulent, so that everything was thrown into dire confusion. Finally, the Romans won the day, killing many men and capturing eight elephants, and they occupied the enemy's entrenchments."

Aftermath
Back in Greece, Pyrrhus went to war with the kingdom of Macedon. He deposed its king, Antigonus II, and briefly ruled Macedon and Thessaly. In 272 BC he supported Cleonymus’ claim to the Spartan throne. He besieged Sparta and aimed to gain control of the Peloponnese by taking this city. However, he met fierce resistance and gave this up. He was then called to intervene in a dispute in Argos, but was killed in a street battle there.

After the war, Rome asserted its hegemony in southern Italy. In 272 BC, the year Pyrrhus died, Rome captured Tarentum.  Livy's Periochae recorded that in 272 BC a Carthaginian navy brought help to Tarentum and broke the treaty with Rome. However, Cassius Dio wrote that the Tarentines called in the Carthaginians to help them against Milo, the commander of the Epirot garrison, when they heard that Pyrrhus had died. They were angry with Milo because he mistreated them. They had attacked him, but they did not achieve anything and then occupied the fortress of the city and kept harassing Milo from there. The Roman consul Lucius Papirius Cursor besieged the city. Hemmed in by the Romans on land and by the Carthaginians on the sea, Milo surrendered the fortress (presumably he had regained it) to Lucius Papirius on the condition that he would be allowed to leave with his men and his money. The city was handed over to the Romans and the Carthaginian fleet left. The Tarentines agreed to pull down the city walls and pay tribute. Prior to taking on Tarentum, Lucius Papirius had defeated the Bruttii, while his colleague Spurius Carvilius Maximus fought the Samnites.

The capture of Tarentum also gave the Romans control over the Messapii of central and part of southern Apulia, who, although they had fought against Tarentum earlier in history, had become closely tied with Tarentum since 304 BC. In 267 BC, the consuls Marcus Atilius Regulus and Lucius Julius Libo conquered the Salentini (who lived in southern Apulia) and captured the town of Brundisium. Cassius Dio wrote that the Romans used the excuse that they had sided with Pyrrhus and that they were now overrunning the territories of their allies, but in fact, they were after the fine harbor of Brundisium, which was the gateway for sailing to the eastern Mediterranean. They sent colonists to Brundisium and other towns. Livy's Periochae recorded that in that year the Umbrians were also defeated. Brundisium later became the port for sailing to the eastern Mediterranean. 
 
Cassius Dio wrote that after the capture of Tarentum in 272 BC the Romans turned their attention to Rhegium, which had taken Croton by treachery, razed it to the ground, and killed the Romans who were there. They prevented intervention by the Mamertines (the mercenaries who had seized Messana, on the other side of the narrow Strait of Messina) whom Rhegium had expected to secure as allies, by making an agreement with them. The Romans besieged the city but suffered from a scarcity of food. Hiero II became the Tyrant of Syracuse after Pyrrhus left Italy. Since he was weary of the Carthaginians who were encroaching on Sicily, he favoured the Romans. He sent grain to the Roman troops which were besieging the city, thereby helping them to seize it. Rhegium was restored to its survivors and the rebel garrison was punished. We do not know when the siege started, but we do know that Hiero II assumed power in Syracuse in 270 BC.

Dionysius of Halicarnassus wrote that in 270 BC there was a second rebellion by the Roman garrison in Rhegium (which included some Italic allies). The consul Gaius Genucius Clespina seized the city and restored it to its people. He took the rebels to Rome. They were sentenced to death by the Assembly of the Tribes. The 4,500 men, 300 at a time, were bound to stakes. They were scourged and then the back tendons of their necks were severed. They were not buried and their bodies were left to be torn by birds and dogs in the Roman Forum.

An entry in Livy's Periochae suggests that the tensions between Rome and Tarentum encouraged rebellions. It recorded that in 282 BC "[t]he Samnites revolted. In several battles, many commanders successfully fought against them and against the Lucanians, Bruttians, and Etruscans." As noted above, Zonaras wrote that in 280 BC the consul Tiberius Coruncanius campaigned in Etruria and that the Etruscans concluded a peace treaty with Rome. After the war the Bruttians submitted willingly and gave up half of their Sila mountain district which was rich in timber (fir, black poplar, pitch and stone pine, beech, and oak). Cornell thinks that the rebellion of the Samnites and Lucani lasted a decade. We do not have much detail from the sources, but the annals of the Fasti Capitolini list ten triumphs over these peoples between 282 BC and 272 BC. Cornell writes that the final defeat of Samnium and Lucania was marked by the foundation of colonies at Paestum in 273 BC, Beneventum in 268 BC, and Aesernia in 263 BC."

In 268 BC a rebellion by the Picentes in central Italy was suppressed and a colony was founded at Ariminum. A colony was also established at Cosa, on the coast of southern Etruria, in 273 BC.

The Pyrrhic War was Rome's first confrontation with the professional armies and mercenaries of the Hellenistic kingdoms in the eastern Mediterranean. The Roman victory drew attention to the emerging Roman power among these states. Ptolemy II, the king of the Ptolemaic Kingdom in Egypt, established diplomatic relations with Rome. He sent envoys to Rome and gave generous gifts to Roman envoys who went to Alexandria.

Chronology
282 BC
 Ten Roman ships appear off the coast of Tarentum.  
 Philocharis of Tarentum views Cornelius' expedition as a violation of an ancient naval treaty, and attacks the expedition, sinking four ships and capturing one.
 Tarentum attacks the Roman garrison at Thurii, expels it, and sacks the city.
 Rome dispatches an embassy to Tarentum, which is rejected and insulted by The Tarentines.
 The Roman senate declares war on Tarentum.
 Consul Lucius Aemilius Barbula ceases hostilities with the Samnites, and moves against Tarentum.
281 BC
 The Tarentines sent envoys to call on Pyrrhus to protect them against the Romans; Pyrrhus is encouraged by the claim that the Samnites, Lucani and Messapi had gathered an army of 50,000 infantry and 20,000 cavalries.
 Pyrrhus asks Antiochus I for money and Antigonus II to lend him ships to carry his army to Italy. Ptolemy II gives him 5,000 infantry and 2,000 cavalries on the condition that they would not serve him for more than two years. Pyrrhus appoints Ptolemy as guardian of his kingdom while he was away. 
280 BC
 Pyrrhus sends Cineas ahead to Tarentum
 Pyrrhus also sends Milo ahead to Tarentum
 Pyrrhus sets sail for Italy.
 Pyrrhus arrives in Terentum, bringing war elephants.
 The Samnites, Lucani, Bruttii, and Messapi ally with Pyrrhus.
 Pyrrhus offers to negotiate with the Romans.
 Pyrrhus defeats the Romans at the Battle of Heraclea.
 Locris sides with Pyrrhus.
 Rhegium asks for Rome's protection. The Roman place garrison in the city. These soldiers seize it, killing many of its people.
 The consul Tiberius Coruncanius is recalled from Etruria to defend Rome.
 The ranks of the legions of the consul Publius Valerius Laevinus are replenished. 
 Pyrrhus advances on Capua, Publius Valerius Laevinus garrisons the city.
 Pyrrhus sets out for Neapolis, but he does not accomplish anything
 Pyrrhus advances as far as Anagni or Fregellae in Latium and then goes to Etruria.
 Pyrrhus finds out the Etruscans allied with Rome; the two Roman consuls pursue him. 
 Pyrrhus withdraws and gets close to Campania. Laevinus confronts him with an army. Pyrrhus refuses battle and returns to Tarentum.
 Mago, a Carthaginian commander goes to Rome with a fleet of 140 warships to offer help. The Roman senate declines the offer.
 Mago goes to see Pyrrhus privately, ostensibly to negotiate peace. In reality, he wanted to check his intentions regarding a plea for help by the Greek cities in Sicily. 
 Gaius Fabricius Luscinus is sent on a mission to Pyrrhus to negotiate the release of Roman prisoners of war. Pyrrhus attempts to bribe Fabricius, and when he cannot, releases the prisoners without ransom. [B]
 Pyrrhus sends Cineas to Rome as the ambassador of Pyrrhus to negotiate peace or a truce.
 Appius Claudius Caecus calls for Pyrrhus to leave Italy and for Cineas to leave Rome immediately. The senate seconds him.
 Cineas returns to Pyrrhus, and calls the Roman senate "a parliament of kings". He also assessed that the Romans have twice as many soldiers as those who fought at the previous battle and many more reserve men.
279 BC
 Pyrrhus invades Apulia, and is confronted by the Roman army.
 Pyrrhus defeats the Romans at the Battle of Asculum, but suffers heavy losses.
 The Carthaginians and the Romans conclude an alliance treaty.
 When Gaius Fabricius discovers a plot by Pyrrhus' doctor, Nicias, to poison him; he sends a warning to Pyrrhus.
 The Greek cities in Sicily ask Pyrrhus for help against the Carthaginians. Pyrrhus agrees.
 Cineas goes to Rome again, but he is unable to negotiate peace terms.
 The Roman garrison at Rhegium seizes the town, killing many of its people. The Romans retake the city and execute the rebels. 
 Joint Roman-Carthaginian expedition sent to Rhegium.
278 BC
 During his second consulship, after Pyrrhus went to Sicily, Gaius Fabricius Luscinus, is sent against the rebel garrison at Rhegium. He seizes the city and restores it to its people. The surviving rebels are taken to Rome and executed for treason. 
 The Carthaginians and the Romans conduct an operation against the rebel Roman garrison which had seized Rhegium
278–75 BC
 Pyrrhus leaves Italy and crosses over to Sicily.
 The Carthaginians blockade Syracuse
 Pyrrhus lands at Catana and marches on Syracuse, the Carthaginians leave.
 Sosistratus and Thoenon hand over Syracuse to Pyrrhus. Pyrrhus arranges peace between them.
 Embassies from many Sicilian cities come to Pyrrhus offering their support.
 Pyrrhus takes control of Agrigentum and thirty other cities which previously belonged to Sosistratus.
 Pyrrhus attacks the territory of the Carthaginians in Sicily.
 Pyrrhus captures Heraclea Minoa, Azones, Eryx, and Panormus. The other Carthaginian or Carthaginian-controlled cities surrender 
 Pyrrhus defeats the Mamertines. [C]
 Pyrrhus starts the siege of Lilybaeum
 The Carthaginians start negotiations. Pyrrhus tells them to leave Sicily. 
 Pyrrhus abandons the siege of Lilybaeum.
 Pyrrhus decides to build a fleet to invade Africa to conquer Carthage.
 To man his fleet Pyrrhus treats the Greek cities in Sicily in a despotic and extortionate manner. 
 Pyrrhus has Thoenon of Syracuse executed on suspicion of treason, and his despotic behavior makes him unpopular with the Sicilians.
 The Greek cities in Sicily turned against Pyrrhus. Some of them sided with Carthage, others called in the Mamertine mercenaries.
275 BC
 Pyrrhus receives a letter from the Tarentines and Samnites. The latter asked for his assistance. This gives Pyrrhus an excuse to leave Sicily without appearing to be running away.
 Pyrrhus sails to Italy. His fleet is caught in a storm. Pyrrhus is attacked by a Carthaginian fleet in the Strait of Messina. [D] [E]
 The Mamertines fight Pyrrhus on the mainland. Many of his elephants and men are killed. Pyrrhus is wounded, but he manages to win the battle. [F] 
 The consul Manius Curius Dentatus expelled a contingent in Croton and seized the city. 
 Locris went over to the Romans...
 Pyrrhus sacks the town of Locri, including with treasure of the temple of Persephone. [F]
 Pyrrhus' fleet is caught in a storm after leaving Locris.
 The consuls Lucius Cornelius Lentulus Caudinus and Manius Curius Dentatus, were fighting in Lucania and Samnium respectively.
 The Romans defeat Pyrrhus at the Battle of Beneventum.
 Pyrrhus leaves Italy; the Pyrrhic War ends.

[A] According to Appian, this fleet was led by the ex Roman consul Publius Cornelius Dolabella. According to Cassius Dio, it was led by the consul Gaius Fabricius Luscinus. According to Zonaras, it was led by Lucius Valerius, whom he described as ‘the admiral’.
[B] According to Cassius Dio, Cineas was sent to Rome before the embassy of Fabricius. According to, Plutarch he was sent after this embassy.
[C] this mission against the Mamertines was mentioned only by Plutarch. Diodorus Siculus, whose information is more detailed did not mention it.
[D] This battle was mentioned by Plutarch and Apian, but not by Dionysius of Halicarnassus. 
[E] According to Dionysius of Halicarnassus, Pyrrhus was caught in a storm while he was sailing to Italy. Some of his ships were sunk, some drifted to the Strait of Messana and some were swept to Locris. According to Appian, Pyrrhus was caught in a storm when he left Locris.
[F] According to Appian and Cassius Dio, the treasure was plundered in Locris, according to Dionysius of Halicarnassus, it was seized in Syracuse.

Game 

 2018: Pyrrhus Imperator (Vae Victis n°143), Boardgame about the Pyrrhic War in Italy and Sicily.

Notes

References
 Primary sources
 Appian, Roman History, Book 3, The Samnite Wars, Loeb Classical Library, Vol. 1, Books 1–8.1, Loeb, 1989;  
 Cassius Dio, Roman History, Vol 1, Books 1–11, (Loeb Classical Library), Loeb, 1989;  
 Dionysius of Halicarnassus, Roman Antiquities, Nabu Press, 2011;  
 Diodorus Siculus, Library of History, Loeb Classical Library Vol. 11, Books 21–32, Loeb, 1989;  
 Plutarch, Lives, Vol. 9, Demetrius and Antony. Pyrrhus and Gaius Marius (Loeb Classical Library), Loeb, 1920; ASIN B00E6TGQKO 

 Secondary sources
 Abbott. J., Pyrrhus, King of Epirus, A Biography. This was written in the nineteenth century. It had been published by CreateSpace Independent Publishing Platform, 2016; 
 Champion, J. Pyrrhus of Epirus, Pen & Sword Military, 2016; 
 Cowan, R., Roman Conquests: Italy, Pen & Sword Military, 2009; 
 Franke, P.R., Pyrrhus, in The Cambridge Ancient History, Volume 7, Part 2: The Rise of Rome to 220 BC, 1990; ASIN: B019NEM4E8
 Garoufalias, P., Pyrrhus, King of Epirus, Stacey International, 1978; ISB: 978-0905743134
 Grant, M., The History of Rome, Faber & Faber, 1986; 

 
Wars involving the Roman Republic
Wars involving Carthage
Wars involving Epirus
Wars involving city-states of Magna Graecia
270s BC conflicts
280s BC conflicts
3rd century BC in the Roman Republic
3rd century BC in Greece
Roman–Greek wars